DBL-583 is a selective dopamine reuptake inhibitor of the piperazine chemical class. It is the decanoate ester of a hydroxy vanoxerine. DBL-583 breaks down very slowly in the body, lasting for up to a month after a single injection.

See also
 GBR-12783
 GBR-12935
 GBR-13069
 GBR-13098

References

Decanoate esters
Dopamine_reuptake_inhibitors
1-(2-(Bis(4-fluorophenyl)methoxy)ethyl)piperazines